Mariana Duque Mariño and María Irigoyen were the defending champions, but Duque Mariño chose not to participate. Irigoyen partnered Danka Kovinić, but lost in the quarterfinals to Akgul Amanmuradova and Natela Dzalamidze.

Alexandra Cadanțu and Chantal Škamlová won the title, defeating Kaitlyn Christian and Giuliana Olmos in the final, 6–1, 6–3.

Seeds

Draw

Draw

References
Main Draw

Hungarian Pro Circuit Ladies Open - Doubles